Jan Král (born 5 April 1999) is a Czech professional footballer who plays as a centre-back for FK Jablonec on loan from Belgian First Division A club Eupen.

Career
He made his senior league debut for Varnsdorf on 30 July 2017 in their Czech National Football League 1–0 home loss against Třinec.

On 24 June 2022, Král signed a three-year contract with Eupen in Belgium. In January 2023, he returned to his native Czech Republic to join FK Jablonec on loan until the end of the season.

References

External links
 Jan Král official international statistics
 

1999 births
Living people
People from Česká Lípa
Sportspeople from Liberec
Czech footballers
Czech Republic youth international footballers
Association football defenders
FK Mladá Boleslav players
FK Varnsdorf players
FC Erzgebirge Aue players
FC Hradec Králové players
K.A.S. Eupen players
FK Jablonec players
Czech First League players
2. Bundesliga players
Belgian Pro League players
Czech National Football League players
Czech expatriate footballers
Czech expatriate sportspeople in Germany
Expatriate footballers in Germany
Czech expatriate sportspeople in Belgium
Expatriate footballers in Belgium